L34 may refer to:
 60S ribosomal protein L34
 , a destroyer of the Royal Navy
 , a sloop of the Royal Navy
 Nissan Altima (L34), a Japanese automobile
 Holden LH Torana SL/R 5000 L34, an Australian automobile
 Zeppelin LZ 78, an airship of the Imperial German Navy